Many advertising characters used as mascots and characters by companies in Australia and New Zealand are similar to those used in the United States and the United Kingdom. There are, however, quite a number that are unique to these two nations.

Many advertisements shown on New Zealand television are made in Australia, and many Australian and New Zealand companies operate similar businesses on both sides of the Tasman Sea. As such, there is considerable overlap in advertising characters and mascots found in the two countries.

The following is a list of notable mascots and characters created specifically for advertising purposes in Australia and New Zealand, listed alphabetically by the product they represent.

See also
 List of Australian sporting mascots
 List of American advertising characters
 List of European and British advertising characters

References

External links
"NZ Association of Retired Advertising Icons"

Australian and New Zealand
Advertising characters, List of
Advertising characters, List of
Advertising in Australia
Advertising in New Zealand
Australian and New Zealand advertising characters
Australian mascots